The montane shaggy rat (Dasymys montanus) is a species of rodent in the family Muridae.
It is found in Uganda and possibly Democratic Republic of the Congo.
Its natural habitats are subtropical or tropical moist montane forest, subtropical or tropical high-altitude grassland, and swampland. It is threatened by habitat loss. In terms of appearance it is of moderate size compared to others in its genus Dasymys, with dark grey long, fine, hair. It has a fairly short tail compared to its size (roughly 70% of its body's size).

References

Additional references

Dasymys
Mammals described in 1906
Taxa named by Oldfield Thomas
Taxonomy articles created by Polbot